The LCDR Echo class was a class of five steam locomotives, initially of the 4-2-0 wheel arrangement. They were designed by Thomas Russell Crampton for the London, Chatham and Dover Railway (LCDR) as "1st class fast passenger" locomotives.

During 1859–60 the LCDR board considered the need for new locomotives to operate lines then under construction. After consultation with various engineers, including Charles Patrick Stewart (of Sharp, Stewart and Company), Robert Sinclair (of the Eastern Counties Railway) and Crampton, they decided upon forty new locomotives: eight 1st class fast locomotives, seventeen general purpose passenger locomotives, and fifteen goods locomotives. After discussion with William Martley, the quantities needed for the two passenger types were revised to five and 24 respectively. Tenders were sought, and these were considered in July 1860, when orders were placed with several firms for what were to become the Echo, Tiger and Acis classes.

The Echo class were ordered from the firm of Robert Stephenson & Co. at a price of £3,400 each. As with the Tiger and Acis classes, the locomotives were equipped with the Cudworth coal-burning firebox. They were delivered to the LCDR between March and May 1862. During 1863–64, the locomotives were rebuilt to the 4-4-0 wheel arrangement.

Like other LCDR locomotives delivered prior to 1874, the locomotives had no numbers at first, being distinguished by name. In November 1875, William Kirtley (who had replaced Martley following the latter's death in 1874) allotted the class letter K. The locomotives were then given the numbers 27–31. One was withdrawn in 1896, but four lasted long enough to enter South Eastern and Chatham Railway (SECR) stock when the SECR was formed at the start of 1899. Their numbers were to be increased by 459 to avoid duplication with former South Eastern Railway locomotives, but before this was done, one more had been withdrawn. Accordingly, three became SECR nos. 487, 488 and 490, but soon after, the numbers of the first two were needed for new construction, so they were transferred to the duplicate list and had their SECR numbers suffixed with the letter A. The last one was withdrawn in August 1906.

Notes

References

Echo
4-2-0 locomotives
4-4-0 locomotives
Railway locomotives introduced in 1862
Robert Stephenson and Company locomotives
Scrapped locomotives
Standard gauge steam locomotives of Great Britain